The Río Cesar white-fronted capuchin (Cebus cesarae) is a species of gracile capuchin monkey from the Río Cesar Valley in northern Colombia.  It had previously been considered a subspecies of the white-fronted capuchin (C. albifrons).  Genetic analysis by Jean Boubli in 2012 revealed that the Río Cesar white-fronted capuchin is actually more closely related to the Colombian white-faced capuchin (C. capucinus) than it is to C. albifrons.  Some authors regard it to be a subspecies of the varied white-fronted capuchin (C. versicolor cesarae).

The Río Cesar white-fronted capuchin lives in dry semi-deciduous forest, gallery forest and mangroves. Its fur is light colored.

References

Capuchin monkeys
Mammals of Colombia
Mammals described in 1949
Taxa named by Philip Hershkovitz
Primates of South America